Oxytelus nigriceps is a species of rove beetle widely spread in Asia. It is found in China, Hong Kong, South Korea, Japan, Philippines, Vietnam, Thailand, Myanmar, Malaysia, Singapore, Indonesia, New Guinea, Bismarck Islands, Pakistan, India, Nepal, Sri Lanka, and Bangladesh.

Description
Male and female both having similar length of about 4.1 mm. Body is brown in color. Head is dark brown in color with  pitchy disc. Pronotum is darker brown. Elytra testaceous and legs are brownish. In male, head is sub-pentagonal. Clypeus sub-rectangular. Mandibles are slender and slightly curved. Epistomal suture with incurved lateral portions. Eyes are convex with coarse facets. Mandible is slender and slightly curved. Pronotum transverse. Elytra punctate and rugose. Abdomen coriaceous with dense fine hairs. Female is similar to male. Spermatheca slim and bent twice.

References 

Staphylinidae
Insects of Sri Lanka
Insects of India
Beetles described in 1859